In linear algebra, a linear relation, or simply relation, between elements of a vector space or a module is a linear equation that has these elements as a solution. 

The relations between  form a module. The syzygy module depends on the choice of a generating set, but it is unique up to the direct sum with a free module.

Higher order syzygy modules are defined recursively: a first syzygy module of a module  is simply its syzygy module. Hilbert's syzygy theorem states that, if  is a polynomial ring in  indeterminates over a field, then every th syzygy module is free. The case  is the fact that every finite dimensional vector space has a basis, and the case  is the fact that  is a principal ideal domain and that every submodule of a finitely generated free  module is also free.

The construction of higher order syzygy modules is generalized as the definition of free resolutions, which allows restating Hilbert's syzygy theorem as a polynomial ring in  indeterminates over a field has global homological dimension .

The module of trivial relations of an ideal is the submodule of the first syzygy module of the ideal that is generated by the trivial relations between the elements of a generating set of an ideal. The concept of trivial relations can be generalized to higher order syzygy modules, and this leads to the concept of the Koszul complex of an ideal, which provides information on the non-trivial relations between the generators of an ideal.

Basic definitions

Let  be a ring, and  be a left -module.

It makes sense to call it a syzygy of  without regard to  because, although the syzygy module depends on the chosen generating set, most of its properties are independent; see , below.

If the ring  is Noetherian, or, at least coherent, and if  is finitely generated, then the syzygy module is also finitely generated. Continuing this way one can define a th syzygy module for every positive integer .

Hilbert's syzygy theorem asserts that, if  is a finitely generated module over a polynomial ring  over a field, then any th syzygy module is a free  module.

Stable properties

Generally speaking, in the language of K-theory, a property is stable if it becomes true by making a direct sum with a sufficiently large free module. A fundamental property of syzygies modules is that there are "stably independent" on choices of generating sets for involved modules. The following result is the basis of these stable properties.Proof. As  is a generating set, each  can be written

This provides a relation  between  Now, if  is any relation, then 
 
is a relation between the  only. It is straightforward to prove that this decomposition is unique, and this proves the result. 

This proves that the first syzygy module is "stably unique". For proving this, it suffices to apply twice the preceding proposition for getting two decompositions of the module of the relations between the union of the two generating sets.

This completes the proof to the following theorem.

Relationship with free resolutions
This defines an exact sequence

Repeating again and again this construction, one gets a long exact sequence

where all  are free modules.

It follows that the study of free resolutions is the same as the study of syzygy modules. 

A free resolution is finite of length  if  is free.

This allows restating Hilbert's syzygy theorem: If  is a polynomial ring in  indeterminates over a field , then every free resolution is finite of length at most .

The global dimension of a commutative Noetherian ring is either infinite, or the minimal  such that every free resolution is finite of length at most . A commutative Noetherian ring is regular if its global dimension is finite. In this case, the global dimension equals its Krull dimension. So, Hilbert's syzygy theorem may be restated in a very short sentence that hides much mathematics: A polynomial ring over a field is a regular ring.Trivial relations
In a commutative ring , one has always . Therefore, given a generating set  of an ideal , one calls trivial relation or trivial syzygy  every element of the submodule the syzygy module that is generated by these trivial relations between two generating elements. More precisely, the module of trivial syzygies is generated by the relations 

such that   and  otherwise.

 History 
The word syzygy came into mathematics with the work of Arthur Cayley. In that paper, Cayley used it in the theory of resultants and discriminants.
As the word syzygy was used in astronomy to denote a linear relation between planets, Cayley used it to denote linear relations between minors of a matrix, such as, in the case of a 2×3 matrix:

Then, the word syzygy'' was popularized (among mathematicians) by David Hilbert  in his 1890 article, which contains three fundamental theorems on polynomials, Hilbert's syzygy theorem, Hilbert's basis theorem and Hilbert's Nullstellensatz.

In his article, Cayley makes use, in a special case, of what was later called the Koszul complex, after a similar construction in differential geometry by the mathematician Jean-Louis Koszul.

Notes

References 

 
 David Eisenbud, The Geometry of Syzygies, Graduate Texts in Mathematics, vol. 229, Springer, 2005.

Commutative algebra
Homological algebra
Linear algebra
Polynomials